The 1993–94 season was PAOK Football Club's 67th in existence and the club's 35th consecutive season in the top flight of Greek football. The team entered the Greek Football Cup in first round.

Players

Squad

Transfers

Players transferred in

Players transferred out

Kit

Pre-season

Competitions

Overview

Managerial statistics

Alpha Ethniki

Standings

Results summary

Results by round

• Matches are in chronological order

Matches

Greek Cup

First round (group stage)

Second round

Third round

Statistics

Squad statistics

! colspan="13" style="background:#DCDCDC; text-align:center" | Goalkeepers
|-

! colspan="13" style="background:#DCDCDC; text-align:center" | Defenders
|-

! colspan="13" style="background:#DCDCDC; text-align:center" | Midfielders
|-

! colspan="13" style="background:#DCDCDC; text-align:center" | Forwards
|-

|}	

Source: Match reports in competitive matches, rsssf.com

Goalscorers

Source: Match reports in competitive matches, rsssf.com

External links
 www.rsssf.com
 PAOK FC official website

References 

PAOK FC seasons
PAOK